The Western Advocate was a newspaper published in Austin, Texas from February 1843 to February 1844.

Further reading 
 

Defunct newspapers published in Texas
Publications established in 1843
Publications disestablished in 1844
1843 establishments in the Republic of Texas